La Bouëxière ( or) is a commune in the Ille-et-Vilaine department in Brittany in northwestern France.

Its mayor is Stéphane Piquet, who was re-elected in 2020.

Population

Inhabitants of La Bouëxière are called Bouexièrais in French.

International relations
La Bouëxière is twinned with Wingrave in England and Hambrücken in Germany.

See also
Communes of the Ille-et-Vilaine department

References

External links

Mairie La Boëxière
Cultural Heritage 
La Bouëxière website

Communes of Ille-et-Vilaine